This article shows the rosters of all participating teams at the men's rugby sevens tournament at the 2015 Pan American Games in Toronto. Rosters can have a maximum of 12 athletes.

Argentina men's rugby sevens team roster:

 Fernando Luna
 Santiago Alvarez
 German Schulz
 Nicolas Bruzzonel
 Emiliano Boffelli
 Gaston Revol
 Bautista Ezcurra
 Rodrigo Etchart
 Franco Sabato
 Juan Tuculet
 Ramiro Finco
 Axel Muller Aranda

Brazil announced their squad on July 1, 2015.

Fernando Portugal
Martin Schaefer
Juliano Fiori
Matheus Daniel
Lucas Duque
Moisés Duque
Lucas Muller
Lucas Drudi
Lucas Domingues
Matthew Gardner
Gustavo Albuquerque
André Silva

Canada announced their squad on June 23, 2015.

Admir Cejvanovic
Justin Douglas
Sean Duke
Mike Fuailefau
Lucas Hammond
Nathan Hirayama
Harry Jones
Phil Mack
John Moonlight
Matt Mullins
Conor Trainor
Sean White



Guyana announced their squad on July 1, 2015.

 Lancelot Adonis
 Claudius Butts
 Avery Corbin
 Rickford Cummings
 Akeem Fraser
 Ryan Gonsalves
 Phibian Joseph
 Peobo Hamilton
 Patrick King
 Ronald Mayers
 Dwayne Schroeder
 Richard Staglon



United States men's rugby sevens team roster:

 Carlin Isles
 Patrick Blair
 Brett Thompson
 Garrett Bender
 Mike Te'o
 Stephen Tomasin
 Will Holder
 Ben Leatigaga
 Nate Augspurger
 Madison Hughes
 Perry Baker
 Martin Iosefo

Uruguay announced their squad on early July, 2015.

 Gabriel Puig (C)
 Juan Diego Ormaechea
 Nicolas Freitas
 Lucas Puig
 Federico Favaro
 Tomas Etcheverry
 Alfonso Falcón
 Rodrigo Silva
 Santiago Martinez
 Gastón Gibernau
 Ian Schmidt
 Sebastián Schroeder

References

Rugby sevens at the 2015 Pan American Games